In the history of Portugal, a Miguelist (in Portuguese Miguelista) was a supporter of the legitimacy of the king Miguel I of Portugal.  The name is also given to those who supported absolutism as form of government, in opposition to the liberals who intended the establishment of a constitutional regime in Portugal.

Miguel was regent for his niece Queen Maria II of Portugal, and potential royal consort. However, he claimed the Portuguese throne in his own right on the grounds that the "Fundamental Laws of the Kingdom" deprived his elder brother Pedro IV of his right to reign (and of any right of Pedro's daughter to inherit the kingdom from her father) when Pedro became sovereign of the former Portuguese colony of Brazil and launched war on Portugal to oust Miguel as a usurper.

This overall led to a political crisis, during which many people were killed, imprisoned, persecuted or sent into exile, culminating in the Portuguese Liberal Wars between authoritarian Absolutists (led by Miguel) and progressive Constitutionalists (led by Pedro).

In the end, Miguel was forced from the throne and lived the last 32 years of his life in exile.

Miguelism is based not only on the premise that Miguel and his line have legitimate right to the Portuguese throne, but also on defense of the traditional principles of a conservative monarchy based in Catholic values and in the absolute power of the king, in contrast to the Enlightenment values.

Miguelist Braganzas
King Miguel I was exiled following the Convention of Evora-Monte (1834), which put an end to the Liberal Wars. The throne was retaken by his niece, Queen Maria II, and a liberal regime was installed.

In exile, the former king married a wealthy Bavarian princess, Adelaide of Löwenstein-Wertheim-Rosenberg. This marriage was the origin of the new Miguelist branch of the Braganzas and their descendants include not only the current claimant to the Portuguese crown, as well as the monarchs of Belgium, Luxembourg, Liechtenstein, and other claimants to former European monarchies (Habsburg, Habsburg-Este, Savoy, Wittelsbach, Bourbon-Parma, Mecklenburg-Strelitz, Karađorđević).

Finally, this Miguelist branch became the sole Braganza representative when King Manuel II of Portugal (the last male Braganza from the senior liberal branch) died without issue, leaving his Miguelist cousin Duarte Nuno as his closest legitimate Portuguese relative. Also Maria Pia of Saxe-Coburg and Gotha Braganza, who claimed to be the illegitimate daughter of King Carlos I of Portugal, claimed the right to the titles of Duchess of Braganza and to be the rightful Queen of Portugal.

Miguelist claimants to the throne

Genealogical chart
On the family tree below, the Miguelist branch is clearly identified on the right-hand side while the Liberal Branch from Maria II is on the left with the Brazilian Imperial branch descending from her brother Pedro II in the middle. In 1942 the Miguelist pretender Duarte Nuno of Braganza married Maria Francisca de Orléans e Bragança, a great-granddaughter of Pedro II of Brazil. The current pretender Duarte Pio, Duke of Braganza, is therefore descended from both of the feuding brothers Pedro IV of Portugal and Miguel I of Portugal.

See also
Descendants of Miguel I of Portugal
Carlism
Remexido
Legitimists
List of movements that dispute the legitimacy of a reigning monarch

References

19th century in Portugal
Rival successions
Monarchism in Portugal